A peach pit is the pit or stone of a peach.

Peach pit or peachpit may also refer to:
Peach-Pit (manga artist duo), a manga artist duo
Peach Pit (band), a Canadian indie pop band
Peachpit, a publishing company
The Peach Pit, a fictional diner in the Beverly Hills, 90210 franchise

See also
The Pit (disambiguation)